The Good Quaker in French Legend is a 1932 nonfiction collection of writings by Edith Philips. It discusses French interest in Quakerism and Penn's colony during the eighteenth century.

Reception 
French philosophy and literary scholar Albert Schinz remarked that "Students of French literature should know of this book which can be said to be one of the very best pieces of American erudition of the past years in our field."

The Good Quaker in French Legend has also been reviewed in the academic journals Revue de Littérature Comparée and Neophilologus.

References

External links 

 

Books about Christianity
History of Quakerism
Quakerism in the United States
18th-century French literature
1932 non-fiction books
American non-fiction books
University of Pennsylvania Press books